Cecilia Clementi is an Italian-American scientist who specialises in the simulation of biomolecules. She is a Professor of Computational Biophysics at the Free University of Berlin. She was previously a Professor of Chemistry at the Rice University and co-director of the National Science Foundation Molecular Sciences Software Institute. From 2017 to 2019 she held an Einstein Foundation fellowship.

Early life and education 
Clementi is from Italy. She studied physics at the University of Florence, where she earned her Laurea in 1995. After graduating in physics, Clementi moved to the International School for Advanced Studies for her doctoral degree. Clementi was a postdoctoral fellow at the University of California, San Diego, where she was part of the La Jolla Interfaces in Science programme. After completing her postdoctoral research Clementi was appointed as an assistant professor at Rice University.

Research and career 
In 2009 Clementi was made a Professor of Chemistry at Rice University. Her research considers the simulation of complex biophysical processes using large-scale data sets. She specialises in coarse-grain modeling of macromolecular systems. In 2016 Clementi was made co-director of the National Science Foundation Molecular Sciences Software Institute.

Clementi joined the Free University of Berlin in 2017 as an Einstein Foundation fellow, during which she focussed on the multi-scale modelling of biophysical systems in an effort to better understand cellular functions. She was the first Einstein Foundation fellow to be appointed to their Strategic Professorships Program.

Clementi was made a Professor of Physics at the Free University of Berlin in June 2020.

Awards and honours 

 2004 National Science Foundation CAREER Award
 2007 Hamill Innovation award
 2009 Robert A. Welch Foundation Norman Hackerman Award in Chemical Research
 2014 Hamill Innovation award

Selected publications 

 
 
 The complete list of publication is available on Google scholar

Underwater photography 
Clementi is also a scuba divemaster and underwater photographer. Some of her photographs are shown in her Instagram page

References 

Living people
Year of birth missing (living people)
Computational biologists
Biophysicists
American people of Italian descent
University of Florence alumni
Academic staff of the Free University of Berlin
Women computational biologists
Women biophysicists
Italian biophysicists
American biophysicists
21st-century American women scientists
American women academics